Dento-alveolar may refer to:
The alveolar process, the ridge of bone that contains dental alveolus
A dento-alveolar consonant, a consonant that is articulated with a flat tongue against the alveolar ridge and upper teeth